The practice of dentistry in Canada is overseen by the National Dental Examining Board of Canada in conjunction with other agencies, such as the Commission on Dental Accreditation of Canada and the Royal College of Dentists of Canada. In 2013 there were 21,109 dentists in Canada according to the Canadian Dental Association.

Licensure 
Dentistry is a regulated profession in Canada. 
In order to practice dentistry, a dentist must obtain a license or permit from the province or territory they wish to practice in. The main requirement to obtain licensure in all Canadian provinces and territories is passing the National Dental Examination Board exams.  Several provinces require applicants to complete a jurisprudence and ethics examination which tests knowledge related to local laws, ethics, and regulation of the profession.

NDEB examination 

Candidates seeking to practice dentistry in Canada must successfully complete a two-part examination administered by the National Dental Examining Board of Canada (NDEB). Dental students at accredited Canadian and American dental schools are permitted to take the examination no earlier than 3 months prior to graduation, which usually means the March of their graduating year. Upon successful completion of the exam, the NDEB issues a certificate to the candidate.

To be eligible to write the NDEB exam, candidates must have:
 Graduated from an accredited dental school in Canada, the United States, Australia (since 2011), New Zealand (since 2011), or Ireland (since 2012)  or
 Passed the equivalency process for graduates of other dental schools (foreign trained dentists).

Qualifying (advanced standing) programs and the equivalency process for foreign-trained dentists
Foreign-trained dentists can obtain a DMD or DDS from an accredited dental school in Canada or the United States by enrolling in a qualifying or advanced standing program. Typically, the program would consist of the last two to three years of a typical dental program.

The dental schools that offer these programs in Canada are:
Dalhousie University
University of Alberta
University of British Columbia
University of Toronto
University of Manitoba
University of Western Ontario
McGill University
Université de Montréal
University of Saskatchewan

In 2011, the equivalency process for foreign trained dentists was launched.

The process consists of three exams:
 Assessment of fundamental knowledge written exam. An exam based on multiple choice question format.
 Assessment of clinical skills exam: a practical exam on typodonts and manikins.
 Assessment of clinical judgement written exam.
The alternative route of going through a qualifying program or advanced standing program still exists.
To gain a licence to practice dentistry in Canada: there is International Dentist Advanced Placement Program (IDAPP).Non-accredited programs
Countries recognised by the Commission on Dental Accreditation of Canada (CDAC) or the American Dental Association Commission on Dental Accreditation (CODA) are:
Australia, Canada, Ireland, New Zealand, USA. 
If you qualified in a country not listed above, you will be considered non-accredited.

When it first launched in 2011, only 44 candidates passed the equivalency process. In 2014 over 260 candidates passed and in 2017, that number rose to 307 candidates. These numbers are expected to keep going up as the number of candidates challenging the exams has been rising steadily year after year.

Over-saturation of dentists in Canada 
According to the Canadian Dental Association, the population-to-dentist ratio has been dropping in all provinces and territories. This dentist glut is resulting in growing competition and tough times for dentists especially in urban centres like Toronto.

Dental groups in Canada 
dentalcorp is Canada’s largest network of dental clinics. It started in 2011 and has grown to over 500 locations serving 2 million Canadians . Altima Dental was established in 1993 and has over 30 dental offices.  Other dental groups include 123dentist, Dental Choice  and tooth corner Dental. These big groups, however, are also gaining increased criticism for lacking a "personal touch".

Achievements
The first woman to be licensed as a dentist in Canada was Emma Gaudreau Casgrain in 1898. She was trained by her husband, dental surgeon Henri-Edmond Casgrain, an innovator in dentistry.

References

External links 

National Dental Examining Board of Canada
Royal College of Dentists of Canada
Canadian Dental Association
Association of Canadian Faculties of Dentistry